Calf Studio Gear, often referred to as Calf Plugins, is a set of open source LV2 plugins for the Linux platform. The suite intends to be a complete set of plugins for audio mixing, virtual instruments and mastering. As of version 0.90.0 there are 47 plugins in the suite.

History 
Calf Studio Gear development started in late 2007 when the LV2 plugin standard was in its infancy. Calf Studio Gear was one of the first projects to bring graphical audio plugins to Linux. The first versions up to 0.0.19 included support for LADSPA and DSSI as well which was dropped in December 2011.

The project was initiated by Krzysztof Foltman. In 2009 Markus Schmidt became interested in development of the plugin suite due to his frustration with proprietary software. He has been a driving force behind the plugins ever since and has been responsible for the overall design of Calf Studio Gear, as well as being the brains behind the DSP of many of its plugins.

Included plugins 

Calf Studio Gear is the most complete suite of plugins for Linux. The included plugins are:
 Instruments
 Organ: organ emulator with full access to the sound generators
 Monosynth: a monophonic synthesizer
 Fluidsynth: SF2 player based on the FluidSynth library
 Wavetable (experimental): wavetable based synthesizer in experimental state
 Modulation Effects
 Multi Chorus: chorus effect with multiple, individual delay lines and graphical display
 Phaser: phaser effect with graphical display of the frequency response
 Flanger: flanger effect with graphical display of the frequency response
 Rotary Speaker: Leslie speaker emulation
 Pulsator: LFO for Tremolo effects
 Ring Modulator: Ring modulation effect with two LFO modulating four different parameters
 Delay Effects
 Reverb: Reverberation effect
 Vintage Delay: beat-oriented delay effect with filters and synchronization
 Compensation Delay Line: distance based delay for compensating speaker line-ups
 Reverse Delay: reversed delay effect
 Dynamics
 Compressor: compressor with New York compression and graphical display
 Sidechain Compressor: compressor with filtered sidechain
 Multiband Compressor: multiband compressor with four individual bands
 Mono Compressor: another compressor based on a different routine
 Deesser: De-essing with different filters and split mode
 Gate: noise gate with parallel setting and graphical display
 Sidechain Gate: noise gate with filtered sidechain
 Multiband Gate: multiband noise gate with four individual bands
 Limiter: lookahead limiter with automatic sustain control
 Multiband Limiter: multiband limiter with four bands
 Sidechain Limiter: multiband limiter with additional sidechain for giving importance to relevant signals
 Transient Designer: controls transients and sustain
 Filters and Equalizers
 Filter: filter for lowpass, highpass, bandpass and bandreject with graphical display
 Filterclavier: filter controlled via MIDI
 Envelope Filter: filter controlled via Envelope detector
 Emphasis: filter for different pre- and de-emphasis like CD and vinyl production
 Vocoder: vocoder effect for 8, 12, 16, 24 or 32 individual bands, with tilting and noise generator
 5-Band-Equalizer: parametrical equalizer offering high shelf, low shelf and three parametric bands, with analyzer
 8-Band-Equalizer: parametrical equalizer with high shelf, low shelf, low pass, high pass and four parametrical bands
 12-Band-Equalizer: parametrical equalizer with high shelf, low shelf, low pass, high pass and eight parametrical bands
 30-Band-Equalizer: graphical equalizer
 Distortion and Saturation
 Saturator: enriches the signal with different harmonics
 Exciter: harmonic exciter adding additional high frequency harmonics
 Bass Enhancer: harmonic exciter adding low frequency harmonics
 Tape Simulator: simulates the effects of magnetic tape and corresponding players
 Vinyl: adds different controllable sounds produced by vinyl records and filters the signal
 Crusher: Bitcrusher and sample rate reduction with smoothing and logarithmic reduction pattern
 Tools
 Mono Input: splits a mono input to stereo, with phase control, phase inversion, soft clip and channel delay
 Stereo Tools: stereo signal manipulation with M/S stereo en- and decoding, phase inversion, phase control, balance, soft clip and channel delay
 Haas Stereo Enhancer: Precedence effect
 Multi Spread: distributes the frequency response of a mono signal to stereo channels
 Multiband Enhancer: enhances or reduces the stereo base and adds harmonics in four different frequency ranges
 X-Over 2 Band: splits the signal in two individual frequency ranges
 X-Over 3 Band: splits the signal in three individual frequency ranges
 X-Over 4 Band: splits the signal in four individual frequency ranges
 Analyzer: Spectrum analyzer with different viewing modes, L/R difference, spectralizer and goniometer

Criticisms 
In the past Calf plugins have been known to cause crashes within Ardour Digital Audio Workstation. This was primarily due to the use of the FFTW library, which until recently was not thread safe. Since October 2014, Calf Studio Gear have moved away from using the FFTW library (released in version 0.0.60 in May 2015).

References

External links
 Official Calf Studio Gear website

Linux
Free audio software
Audio software
Audio software for Linux